This article provides details of international football games played by the Denmark women's national football team from 2010 to 2019.

Results

2014

2015

2016

2017

2018

2019

Head-to-head records
2015—2019 statistics.

FIFA Top 20 
2015—2019 statistics. The statistics include any team that has placed in the FIFA top 20 ranking, from 19 December 2014 to 13 December 2019.

Notes

References

Denmark women's national football team
2010s in Danish sport
2010s in Danish women's sport